Philip Aaberg (born April 8, 1949) is an American pianist and composer. He gained international recognition through a series of successful piano recordings released on Windham Hill Records. Although classically trained, Aaberg incorporates classical, jazz, bluegrass, rock, and new music elements into his compositions and musical structures. Although best known for his solo piano work, he is most at home in the chamber jazz genre. His compositions are noted for their "rigorous keyboard technique, diverse influences, and colorful compositional style."

Early life 
Aaberg was born in Havre, Montana, in 1949 and raised in Chester, Montana. By the age of 14, he was performing with local bands at dances. After receiving his Bachelor of Arts degree in music from Harvard University, he moved to Oakland, California and played in blues clubs for several years. He also toured and recorded as a member of Elvin Bishop's Group at the time of its greatest popularity, and co-wrote the title song of the band's 1976 Struttin' My Stuff release, an album which also included Bishop's biggest hit, "Fooled Around and Fell in Love," featuring Aaberg on piano.

Windham Hill years 
In 1985, Aaberg signed a recording contract with Windham Hill Records and released a solo album titled High Plains. He followed this up with seven more solo albums: Out of the Frame (1988), Upright (1989), Cinema (1992). Aaberg also appeared regularly on the Windham Hill Sampler albums over the past 20 years and has had success in various collaborations and ensemble projects.

Aaberg has performed with the Boston Pops Orchestra and has appeared at the Marlboro Chamber Music Festival. As a guest artist, he has performed on over 200 albums and on PBS's All-American Jazz program, which earned him an Emmy Award nomination. He has appeared with Peter Gabriel and Tom Johnston of the Doobie Brothers in concert.

Sweetgrass Music years 
 In 2000, Aaberg began his own record label with his wife Patty, Sweetgrass Music, through which he has since endeavored to produce music that "connects a global audience to the sweeping landscape of the West." Releases include Field Notes (2000), Live from Montana (2000), which received a Grammy nomination, Christmas (2002), Blue West (2005), High Plains Christmas (2013). Throughout his career, Aaberg has produced music that consistently translated Montana's farms, ranches, and native cultures into "musical concepts" and has "forged a unique keyboard style that paints an audible portrait of his home state." Philip also produces a public radio program "Of the West: Creativity and Sense of Place". He received a Montana Governor's Award for the Arts and in 2011, received a Montana Arts Council Innovator Award. His score for "Class C: The Only Game in Town" was nominated for a regional Emmy. Philip and his wife, Patty, run Sweetgrass Music, the Great Northern Bed and Breakfast, the Westland Suite, and The Bin (recording studio).

Discography 

Solo recordings

 1985 High Plains
1988 Out of the Frame
 1989 Upright
1992 Cinema
 2000 Field Notes
 2000 Live from Montana
 2002 Christmas
 2005 Blue West
2013 High Plains Christmas
 2015 From the Ground Up
 2017 Versatile

Collaborations

 1986 Shape-Of-The-LandThe Shape of the Land(
with Michael Hedges and William Ackerman)
 
 1987 Morning Walk (with Metamora)
 1990 Meridian (with Bernie Krause)
1998 A Christmas Heritage(with New Grange)
 1999 -NewGrange New Grange(with New Grange)
 2001 Tasting-The-Wine-CountryTasting the Wine Country 
(with the Mike Marshall Quintet)
 2008 CrossTime (with Darol Anger)
 2009  Three Part Invention (with Tracy Silverman and Eugene Friesen)
 2010 Raven (with Kristina Stykos)
 2012 Tuli Wamu with Kinobe
 2013
Montana Wild Catswith Jack Walrath and Kelly Roberti
 2014 Tone Poems Live with Steve Hunter

Guest appearances

 1985 Windham Hill Sampler '86
1985 Autumn-Portrait-Windham Hill: Autumn Portrait
1985
A Winter's Solstice, Vol. 1

1988 Solstice-IIA Winter's Solstice, Vol. 2
1989
Sampler-89 Windham Hill Sampler'89

 1990 Restore the Shore
 1990 Windham Hill: The First Ten Years
 1991  Windham Hill Sampler '92
 1992 The Impressionists: A Windham Hill Sampler
 1993 A Winter's Solstice, Vol. 4 (also: co-producer, Track 1)
 1994  Windham Hill Piano Sampler 2
 1995 A Winter's Solstice, Vol. 5
 1995 Windham Hill: The Romantics
 1996 Different Mozart
 1996 Redbook Relaxation: Tranquility
 1996 [https://www.discogs.com/release/20383255-Various-DaybreakRedbook Relaxers: Daybreak
 1996 Redbook Relaxers: Dreamscape
 1996 [https://www.allmusic.com/album/redbook-relaxers-romance-mw0000078956 Redbook Relaxers: Romance
 1996 Redbook Relaxers: Twilight
 1996  Sanctuary: 20 Years of Windham Hill
 1997 Candlelight Moments: Meditative Moments
 1997 Candlelight Moments: Moonlight Reflections
 1997 [https://www.allmusic.com/album/candlelight-moments-serene-sounds-mw0000668487/credits Candlelight Moments: Serene Sounds
 1997 Heritage
 1997 Meditation: Restore
 1997 Redbook Relaxation: Piano Reflections
 1997 Redbook Relaxers: Dinner Party
 1997 Redbook Relaxers: Lullabies
 1997 Summer Solstice: A Windham Hill Collection
 1997 Twilight Jazz (BMG Special Products)
 1998 Best of New Age (Columbia River)
 1998 Moonlight Reflections (BMG Special Products)
 1998 Quiet Moods: Meditative Moments
 1998 Quiet Moods: Romantic Reflections
 1998 Thanksgiving: A Windham Hill Collection
 1998 Tones of Christmas
 1998 Yoga Zone: Music for Yoga Practice
 1999 Moonlight Moments
 1999 Sun Dance: Summer Solstice, Vol. 3
 2000 Healing Harmony
 2000 New Age Christmas [BMG Greeting Card CD]
 2000 Redbook: Daybreak
 2000 Redbook: Dinner Party
 2000 Redbook: Lullabies
 2000 Redbook: Piano Reflections
 2000 Redbook: Romance
 2000 Redbook: Tranquility
 2000 Redbook: Twilight
 2000 Windham Hill Classics: Harvest
 2000 Windham Hill Classics: Journeys
 2000 Windham Hill Classics: Persuasion
 2000 Windham Hill Classics: Reflections
 2001 A Winter's Solstice, Vol. 1: Silver Anniversary Edition
 2001 Meditation: Relax Restore and Revive
 2001 New Age Moods [BMG Special Products]
 2001 Windham Hill Classics: Matters of the Heart
 2001 Windows: Windham Hill 25 Years of Piano
 2002 Ansel Adams: Original Soundtrack Recording from the Film by Ric Burns
 2002 Meditation: Relax
 2002 Peace of Mind (Windham Hill)
 2003 A Windham Hill Christmas, Vol. 2
 2003 Adagio: A Windham Hill Collection
 2003 Prayer: A Windham Hill Collection
 2003 Windham Hill Chill: Ambient Acoustic
 2004 Relaxation (Windham Hill)
 2004 Windham Hill America 
 2004 Windham Hill Christmas: I'll Be Home for Christmas
 2004 Windham Hill Sampler: Winter Wonderland
 2005 A Quiet Revolution: 30 Years of Windham Hill
 2005 A Windham Hill Christmas: The Night Before Christmas
 2005 Cinema: A Windham Hill Collection
 2005 Essential Winter's Solstice
 2005 Heritage
 2005 Released
 2006 Sundown: A Windham Hill Piano Collection
 2007 True
 2008 Blue Dreams
 2008 Meditations
 2012 The Manhattan Blues Project (Steve Hunter)
 2015 Next

See also 
List of ambient music artists

References

External links 
 Official site
 Philip Aaberg  Concert produced by the 11th and Grant program for Montana PBS
 Interview by Fred Pfeiffer (YouTube)
 

Chamber jazz pianists
Harvard College alumni
Musicians from Montana
New-age pianists
Windham Hill Records artists
1949 births
Living people
People from Havre, Montana
People from Chester, Montana
20th-century American pianists
American male pianists
21st-century American pianists
20th-century American male musicians
21st-century American male musicians
American male jazz musicians
Favored Nations artists